仁川 may refer to:
Incheon, city in South Korea
Nigawa, river in Hyogo Prefecture, Japan
Renchuan, town in Zhejiang, China